Phil Hogg is a male wheelchair athlete from the United Kingdom.

Achievements

References

Year of birth missing (living people)
Living people
British male wheelchair racers
21st-century British people